Curl is a reflective object-oriented programming language for interactive web applications whose goal is to provide a smoother transition between formatting and programming. It makes it possible to embed complex objects in simple documents without needing to switch between programming languages or development platforms. The Curl implementation initially consisted of just an interpreter, but a compiler was added later.

Curl combines text markup (as in HTML), scripting (as in JavaScript), and heavy-duty computing (as in Java, C#, or C++) within one unified framework.  It is used in a range of internal enterprise, B2B, and B2C applications.

Curl programs may be compiled into Curl applets, that are viewed using the Curl RTE, a runtime environment with a plugin for web browsers. Currently, it is supported on Microsoft Windows. Linux, and macOS was dropped on March 25, 2019 (starting with version 8.0.8). Curl supports "detached applets", which is a web deployed applet which runs on the user's desktop independent of a browser window much as in Silverlight 3 and Adobe AIR.

Architecture
The Curl language attempts to address a long-standing problem: the different building blocks that make up any modern web document most often require wildly different methods of implementation: different languages, different tools, different frameworks, often completely different teams. The final — and often most difficult — hurdle has been getting all of these blocks to communicate with each other in a consistent manner. Curl attempts to side-step these problems by providing a consistent syntactic and semantic interface at all levels of web content creation: from simple HTML to complex object-oriented programming.

Curl is a markup language like HTML—that is, plain text is shown as text; at the same time, Curl includes an object-oriented programming language that supports multiple inheritance. Curl applications are not required to observe the separation of information, style, and behavior that HTML, Cascading Style Sheets (CSS), and JavaScript have imposed, although that style of programming can be used in Curl if desired.

While the Curl language can be used as an HTML replacement for presenting formatted text, its abilities range all the way to those of a compiled, strongly typed, object-oriented system programming language. Both the authoring (HTML-level) and programming constructs of Curl can be extended in user code. The language is designed so Curl applications can be compiled to native code of the client machine by a just-in-time compiler and run at high speed. Curl applets can also be written so that they will run off-line when disconnected from the network (occasionally connected computing). In fact, the Curl IDE is an application written in Curl.

Syntax
A simple Curl applet for HelloWorld might be

 {Curl 7.0, 8.0 applet}
 {text
    color = "blue",
    font-size = 16pt,
    Hello World}

This code will run if the user has at least one of the Curl versions 7.0 or 8.0 installed.

Curl provides both macros and text-procedures in addition to anonymous procedures and named methods.
An alternative using the text-procedure paragraph would be:

 {paragraph
    paragraph-left-indent=0.5in,
    {text color = "red", font-size = 12pt,
      Hello}
    {text color = "green", font-size = 12pt,
      World}}

Recently this style of layout has been adopted by "builders" in the Groovy language for the JVM, but is also familiar to users of CSS or Tcl/Tk.  Most features for web applications now implemented through combinations of JavaScript libraries + HTML + CSS  are already found within the Curl language, including features usually associated with Prototype + script.aculo.us such as accordion panes.

Curl sets callbacks in the manner also adopted by Groovy:

 {CommandButton width=100pt,
    height = 50pt,
    label = {center {bold Invokes an event handler when clicked}},
    control-color = "orange",
    || Attach the following event handler to this CommandButton
    {on Action do
        {popup-message
            title = "Your Message",
            "This is a user message dialog."
        }
    }}

Curl comments use the vertical bar in several variations.  The simplest is as follows:

 {text A comment can be on a line by itself,
 || A comment on a line by itself
 or it can be at the end || A comment on the same line as code
 of a line.}

Curl as lightweight markup 

Because Curl provides for both user-defined text procedures and stylesheets, Curl can be used readily as domain-specific lightweight markup. A major advantage over plain text HTML markup is that the text encoding can be set to UTF-8, and text entered in a Unicode-enabled editor without any escaping of characters (like JavaScript, Curl is Unicode friendly). A poetry example would be:

 {poem || wraps entire poem
    {stanza  || first verse here in any language
    }
    {stanza  || another verse here in any language
    }
 }

which can initially be implemented by defining the poem and stanza markup as paragraph text formats. Stanza could be further refined to include a hidden navigation anchor for page navigation using the Curl {destination} which is itself a text procedure.

The same markup can be used for different results, as one can style text to be visible in one context and invisible in another. Curl also permits top-level file inclusion so that a source text in markup can be included in different parent files. In education, for example, one could create a source file of test questions, and include it in both a student and a teacher version of the text.

See also
Homoiconicity: Curl is both a programming language and a data format

References

External links

MIT Curl Project, the results of the Curl research project at MIT's Laboratory for Computer Science.
Curl, Inc. and Curl International Corp. develop and distribute a suite of commercial products which are based on the results of the MIT research.  Owned by SCSK Corporation a majority-owned unit of Sumitomo Corp.
InfoWorld review of Curl 6.0 by Martin Heller. InfoWorld awarded Curl its 2008 Technology of the Year award in the Rich Internet Application category.

Declarative programming languages
Functional languages
Lightweight markup languages
Markup languages
Rich web application frameworks
Homoiconic programming languages